Dianna Elizabeth Corcoran (born 20 June 1979 in Parkes, New South Wales) is an Australian country music singer-songwriter. Among numerous awards, she is a three-time Golden Guitar winner

History
Corcoran's initial interest in country music involved yodelling. After finishing high school, Corcoran moved to Adelaide where she worked in three jobs (recruitment, dog food factory and car parts plant) to save enough money to make her first record (Little Bit Crazy). She became a professional musician in 2004. In that year, she toured with Adam Brand as an opening act. It was also in that year that she won her first Golden Guitar Award for New Talent of the Year.

Corcoran has been deployed on three occasions to perform for Australian troops on active duty in war zones around the world, including a tour of Afghanistan with Jenny Morris. During one such tour to the Solomon Islands in March 2007 she met Tom Hinds, an Australian soldier. Corcoran wrote the song "Come Back Home" on the album Keep Breathing for him. She has written other songs about family and childhood experiences, including her father ("If You Hear Angels"), her mother ("You'll Always Love Me More") and her hometown Parkes ("Rocky Hill").

In 2008, Corcoran won Female Artist of the Year. In August, Corcoran was invited by Deborah Conway to take part in the Broad Festival project, which toured major Australian cities including performing at the Sydney Opera House. With Corcoran and Conway were Laura Jean, Liz Stringer and Elana Stone – they performed their own and each other's songs.

Discography

Albums

Awards and nominations

|-
| 2004
| Dianna Corcoran ("I'll Fly Away")
| CMAA Country Music Awards – Female Vocalist of the Year
| 
|-
| 2003
| Dianna Corcoran ("I'll Fly Away")
| Australian Independent Country Music Awards – Rising Star Female
| 
|-
| 2004
| Dianna Corcoran
| Australasian Performing Right Association – Professional Development Award
| 
|-
| 2004
| Dianna Corcoran ("I'll Fly Away")
| CMAA Country Music Awards – New Talent of the Year
| 
|-
| 2004
| Dianna Corcoran ("I'll Fly Away")
| CMAA Country Music Awards – Female Vocalist of the Year
| 
|-
| 2008
| Dianna Corcoran (Then There's Me)
| CMAA Country Music Awards – Female Artist of the Year
| 
|-
| 2008
| Dianna Corcoran (Then There's Me)
| CMAA Country Music Awards – Album of the Year
| 
|-
| 2008
| Dianna Corcoran and Karl Broadie ("Count Your Blessings")
| CMAA Country Music Awards – Vocal Collaboration of the Year
| 
|-
| 2010
| Dianna Corcoran
| Australian Independent Country Music Awards – Artist of the Year
| 
|-
| 2010
| Dianna Corcoran ("Thank You For Cheating on Me")
| Australian Independent Country Music Awards – Female Vocalist of the Year
| 
|-
| 2010
| Dianna Corcoran ("Thank You For Cheating on Me")
| Australian Independent Country Music Awards – Single of the Year
| 
|-
| 2011
| Dianna Corcoran (Keep Breathing)
| CMAA Country Music Awards – Album of the Year
| 
|-
| 2011
| Dianna Corcoran ("Thank You For Cheating on Me")
| CMAA Country Music Awards – Female Artist of the Year
| 
|-
| 2011
| Dianna Corcoran ("Thank You For Cheating on Me")
| CMAA Country Music Awards – Single of the Year
| 
|-
| 2021
| "True Blue" (Amber Lawrence, Aleyce Simmonds, Kirsty Lee Akers and Dianna Corcoran)
| CMAA Country Music Awards - Vocal Collaboration of the Year
| 
|-
|}

References

External links

Living people
1979 births
Australian country singer-songwriters
Australian women singer-songwriters
21st-century Australian singers
21st-century Australian women singers